Good Hope School (GHS) is a prestigious girls' school in Hong Kong with primary and secondary sections, founded in 1954. It is conducted by Missionary Sisters of the Immaculate Conception (M.I.C.). It is located at the junction of Ngau Chi Wan Street and Clear Water Bay Road, on the hill in the eastern outskirt of Ngau Chi Wan.

History
Originally, Good Hope was founded as a kindergarten on Waterloo Road. Good Hope is a Catholic school conducted by the Missionary Sisters of the Immaculate Conception (MIC) and was established in 1954. In 1955, the Primary School opened at its current location. The Secondary School accepted its first Form 1 students in 1957: These students sat for the HKCE Examination in 1962.

To accommodate the increasing number of students, a new wing was opened in 1963. Eventually, Good Hope School, Secondary Section grew to its current size of 36 classes in 1975. The Secondary Section became fully subsidised under the Hong Kong Education Department in 1978. Delia's Wing was inaugurated in 1985. Though Good Hope has discontinued the Kindergarten, the school takes pride in the fact that most of the students remain Good Hopers throughout their primary and secondary years. The primary section was demolished in 2005 and rebuilt in 2008. The kindergarten was also reopened in 2010.

School Mission
Good Hope School puts special emphasis on the Christian values of Love, Hope, Joy and Thanksgiving. Through a whole school approach, the School aims to draw out the potential and foster the sense of uniqueness of each student. Besides, it also provides all Good Hopers with equal opportunities to develop their spiritual, moral, intellectual, physical, social, emotional and aesthetic dimensions. The School also accepts the call to facilitate the formation of graceful, reflective young women who have a global perspective and are mindful of their responsibilities of citizenship and their capability of making a difference.

Houses
Secondary Hopers' Houses are named after trees.

Hazel(榛木)(Yellow)
Oak(橡樹)(Purple/Grey)
Pine(松樹)(Green)
Elm(榆樹)(Blue)
Redwood(紅樹)(Pink/Red)
Sandal(檀香木，白檀木)(Orange)

Primary Hopers' Houses are named after flowers.

Holly(冬青)(Red)
Orchid(蘭花)(Purple)
Pansy(三色堇)(Yellow)
Edelweiss(雪絨花)(Green)
Rose (玫瑰)(Pink)

See also

 Education in Hong Kong
 List of schools in Hong Kong

References

External links
Official Homepage of Good Hope School
Official Homepage of Good Hope School (Secondary Section)
Official Homepage of Good Hope School (Primary Section)
Official Homepage of Good Hope School (Kindergarten Section)

Girls' schools in Hong Kong
Ngau Chi Wan
Roman Catholic primary schools in Hong Kong
Catholic secondary schools in Hong Kong
Educational institutions established in 1954
1954 establishments in Hong Kong
Alliance of Girls' Schools Australasia